Ivan Ivanovich Vorontsov (1890–1917) was an association football player.

International career
Vorontsov made his debut for the Russian Empire on September 14, 1913 in a friendly against Norway. He was the team's captain in that game.

External links
  Profile

1890 births
1917 deaths
Footballers from the Russian Empire
Association football defenders